Isochoic wave is a term used in ultrasound. Substances of a different medium are called isochoic if waves travel through them at the same speed.

Isochoic in ultrasound means that two structures have the same echogenicity in 2D mode (B-mode).

References

 Basic Principles of Ultrasound Physics and Artifacts Made Easy

Ultrasound